Bulbophyllum gracillimum, commonly known as the wispy umbrella orchid, is a species of epiphytic orchid. It has a creeping rhizome, widely spaced, olive green pseudobulbs, each with a single thick, leathery, fleshy leaf and between six and ten purplish red flowers spreading in a semicircular umbel. The flowers have distinctive long, thread-like tails on the lateral sepals. It has a wide distribution and is found in New Guinea, New Caledonia, Indonesia, Malaysia and part of tropical North Queensland.

Description
Flowering occurs between August and March in Australia.

Taxonomy and naming
The wispy umbrella orchid was first formally described in 1895 by Robert Allen Rolfe and given the name Cirrhopetalum gracillimum. The description was published in the Bulletin of Miscellaneous Information, Royal Gardens, Kew but in 1907 Rolfe changed the name to Bulbophyllum gracillimum. The specific epithet (gracillimum) is a Latin word meaning "slenderest".

Distribution and habitat 
Bulbophyllum gracillimum grows on trees in stunted rainforest and in other damp, airy places in Indonesia, Malaysia, New Guinea, New Caledonia, Fiji and Queensland.

Conservation
This orchid is classed as "vulnerable" under the Australian Government Environment Protection and Biodiversity Conservation Act 1999. The main threat to the species is illegal collecting by orchid enthusiasts.

References

gracillimum
Orchids of Queensland
Orchids of New Guinea
Plants described in 1895